Ebrahim Hatamikia (born 23 September 1961) is an Iranian film director, screenwriter, cinematographer and actor. Hatamikia is known for films depicting the Iran–Iraq War's impact on Iran. His films are considered some of the best ever made in the Iranian war cinema and most notable for their attention to social changes brought about by the war. Also, he is best-known for his explorations of the trauma by the war; both on returning soldiers and those who await them, unable to mourn effectively without knowing the fate of their loved ones.

Career 
Ebrahim Hatamikia is among of the filmmakers of the new generation of the cinema of Iran after Iranian Revolution, who is internationally renowned for his role in the cinema of Iran in the 1990s. He was born in 1961 in Tehran to a Persian father and Azeri mother. He began his directing career with some short films and documentaries about the Iran–Iraq War. His movies are considered to be the best that tackle the war and the issues surrounding it. His works have often received admiration in national film festivals. The Glass Agency and In the Name of the Father have won him the best screenplay and directing awards in the sixteenth and twenty-fourth Fajr International Film Festival respectively.

Hatamikia is now considered as an icon of professional religious filmmakers in Iran. The name of Ebrahim Hatamikia was heard for the first time in the short films section of the 3rd Fajr International Film Festival. His The Path (1985) received honors and was recognized by the jury for excellence in presenting a theme related to the war. Hatamikia's early war-related features The Scout (1989) and The Immigrant (1990) explored the psychological and sociological impact of the war on the home front. In his subsequent glossy feature From Karkheh to Rhein (1993), he explored the psychology of a disabled veteran on a medical trip to Germany, adding to the war theme the tension of the direct contact with the West and of displacement to foreign lands. From Karkheh to Rhein considered as an anti-war film. Hatamikia in From Karkheh to Rhein and The Glass Agency have depicted the complex processes of re-integration and re-assimilation, particularly for veterans who were chemically injured or suffered chronic illnesses. The two are particularly praised by Hezbollahi citizens in Iran. Also, Hatamikia's in From Karkheh to Rhein is particularly interesting in connection with the discourse of the Iranian diaspora during the war.

The Glass Agency (1998) portrayed the feelings and life conditions of those who expunged from the public sphere and lost out from Rafsanjani's neoliberalisation. It tells the story of two former soldiers which despite enduring sacrifices by participating in the war, did not enjoy any of the material rewards coming from post-war reconstruction, and had criticized the government's hypocrisy of turning veterans into symbolic heroes but not actually caring for them. By the film, Hatamikia had provoked the government, which then took him to court over the film and barred its release for a while. The Glass Agency is a metaphor for the glass house that Iran became after the war, where internal conflicts have been more salient than international ones. As Esha Momeni noted, it seems that Hatamikia is criticizing the state for that issue, however martyrdom's glorification by him, continues to serve the state by covering up its deficiencies in the post-war era. As Hamid Naficy notes, the film deals with the crisis of reintegrating war veterans into a society that nearly a decade after the war's end seems apathetic to their plight. in addition to criticize the government, it critiques society, which revered the soldiers but now wants to get on with life.

In Amethyst Color (2005) was banned from screening by the order of the Ministry of Intelligence because the film depicts the image of a security official. His other film, Dead Wave (2001) was also prohibited from screening by the demand of military officials. However, that both films were screened in Iranian cinemas at a later time. Despite the IRGC's strong footprint on post-revolutionary cinema, many of Iran's most important directors such as Ebrahim Hatamikia, Rasoul Mollagholipour, and Ahmad-Reza Darvish, who were products of this system of support, have increasingly moved away from the war movies promoted by the IRGC. The situation has reached a point where an important war movie director, Ebrahim Hatamikia publicly criticizes the interference of military personnel in cultural and artistic activities. He talked about this in the press conference for his new film Dead Wave, which has yet to be released despite the fact that it was produced by Ravayat-e Fath Foundation. In fact, reportedly the producer prevented the movie, which is about a military commander obsessed with attacking an American warship who also has problems with his son, from being screened. A very high quality video of this movie was however widely and illegally distributed.

Cinematic style 
As of Richard Peña, The Red Ribbon (1999) reminds a bit of some of the later absurdist dramas by Fernando Arrabal. It is a dense and highly metaphoric drama involving three characters and set in a tank graveyard in the no-man's-land between Iran and Iraq. He aspires to the technical sophistication of Hollywood.

Hatamikia was one of the few war filmmakers with a previous background in Super 8 and animated film production who joined Jihad's Television unit and the IRGC's Audiovisual unit in 1986. He uses the war and its extreme situations as a vehicle to negotiate camouflaged taboo topics. In From Karkheh to Rheine a few veterans doubt about their participation in the war. The television series The Red Soil (2002–2003) momentarily exposes the absurdity of the concept of the nation as a homogeneous entity, with depiction of the confusion around which side of the border belongs on during the Iraqi occupation while portrays in-between spaces of an Iranian Arab and an Iraqi Arab.

His films brilliantly deal with the different and unexpected types of returns. Through the image of exiles seen in From Karkheh to Rhein and The Scent of Joseph's Shirt, Roxanne Varzi notes that the audience come to understand the international scope of the war, and that what binds a nation is so much more than land. Hatamikia believes none Iranian could escape the mark of war, by virtue of association. Therefore, every Iranian takes part in the act of mourning. His films open a new and safe realm for mourning through presenting the nation with its death in a beautiful and artistic way. Aftermore, by influences of Morteza Avini in The Chronicles of Victory (1986–1988) war documentary television series, Hatamikia depicts returning from the imaginary realm through the very visual realm that made that journey possible. At the same time that these films reinstate the importance of faith, they stress the importance of remaining in the realm of the real, with those who are still with us. In The Glass Agency, he envisages martyrdom as the only possible and proper ending for a war veteran. He draw on the themes of the Karbala paradigm, specially martyrdom and self-sacrifice, and employs elements of the Ta'ziyeh. Also, concept of Mostaz'af is present in his films.

In particular, Hatamikia's melodramas have been the hallmark of war films after Morteza Avini's films of the Sacred Defense. Hatamikia's films centered on the trauma of war veterans and the destitute lives they have lived in the post-war period, while Avini's films promoted the heroism of soldiers and the necessity of fighting for the Islamic Republic, however both directors have upheld a somber vision of the war hero.

Even though the war cinema addresses the ideological, charismatic and populist characteristics of the political system, these are raised in the context of war, not as political criticism. In effect these films belong to the war genre rather than a political genre. Because of the agitated political atmosphere of the country, many films were considered political. This was because people were searching for symbolism when analyzing these films. Ebrahim Hatamikia shot From Karkheh to Rhine in Germany, a country in the West. The film is a call for reunion, for the return of women who have been alienated by the Revolution, especially those who have physically left home for the West. In this film, the split between men and women — in this case brother and sister — and the cultural space between them are shown by the different countries in which they live. The westernized sister has to be reconciled with her radical religious Iranian brother. the film was a powerful indictment of the failures of the state to honour its soldiers. The paper warned its readers about the new immoral trend and noted that yet again the Ministry of Culture and Islamic Guidance was at fault; its cinema section had provided a $1 million budget for the film.

The Scent of Joseph's Shirt (1996) is Hatamikia's first female-centric film. The female characters in Hatamikia's films usually have a visible presence even though they may not be the main characters.

The war era has become the theme of many films, with some of them representing the situation of cities in the wartime. Hatamikia in Union of the Good (1992) portrays the general image of Tehran as a quiet city that turned to a location of a rocket war and sometimes this calmness and quietness breaks with the sound of ambulances and fire-fighting alarms.

Recognition 
Hatamikia is one of the most notable members of a group of Iranian filmmakers who experienced the Iran-Iraq War and one of the first Basij filmmakers that took a critical look at post-war Iran by portraying the disillusionment of war veterans and their treatment by both secular society and the government that reneged on its promises. His films appeal to a broad audience because they delicately tread the thin line between what many secular Iranians define as typical Basij government propaganda and the secular anti-government sentiment. In so doing, his films have allowed a space for Iranians to begin to think about and debate the war. Also, they have encouraged a generation of young Iranians to rethink the war and revolutionary values in general.

His ability to translate an American film scenario for an Iranian audience and make it look like the Iran-Iraq war points to the
universality of war, is an issue which overlooked by film critics. However The Glass Agency (1998) was dismissed by American critics as nothing more than an attempt to make an Iranian version of Dog Day Afternoon (Sidney Lumet, 1975), Hatamikia went on to make other imitations, like The Red Ribbon (1999), which looks a lot like The English Patient (Anthony Minghella, 1996).

Political views 
He criticized assassination attempt of the reformist Saeed Hajjarian by writing an open letter to the nation.

Filmography

as director

Short films

Feature films

TV series

other works

Short films

Feature films

TV Series

Documentary appearances

Awards and nominations

Footnotes

Notes

References

Sources

External links 

 
 
 
 
 
 
 Ebrahim Hatamikia's First website (in Persian)
 Ebrahim Hatamikia's Second website (in Persian)
 Ebrahim Hatamikia's Biography
 Ebrahim Hatamikia's portfolio

 
1961 births
Living people
Iranian Azerbaijanis
Iranian film directors
Iranian screenwriters
People from Tehran
Crystal Simorgh for Best Director winners
Producers who won the Best Film Crystal Simorgh
Crystal Simorgh for Best Screenplay winners